Emily Witt is an American investigative journalist based in Brooklyn with a particular focus on modern dating from the feminine perspective.

Life
Witt is a staff writer for The New Yorker and has written for numerous publications including The New York Times, Men's Journal, The New York Observer, n+1, the Oxford American, the London Review of Books, GQ, The Nation, and Miami New Times. Her writing has been described as a blend of "personal writing with social analysis." Her book Future Sex explores how women see the dating world in the 21st century; Publishers Weekly described her book as "an illuminating, hilarious account of sex and dating in the digital age, when hook-up culture and technology have vastly altered the romantic landscape."

Witt is a graduate of Brown University and the University of Cambridge. She also graduated from Columbia's graduate school of investigative journalism. While in Mozambique on a Fulbright scholarship, she reported on Mozambican cinema for U.N. news agencies including IRIN and PlusNews. She wrote for numerous publications and moved to New York City.

At age thirty, she found herself "single and heartbroken" and she resolved to explore why that was the case. Her focus shifted to dating and technology and sexuality; she traveled to San Francisco, dated often, and wrote about her encounters. She profiled the dating app Tinder.

Witt noted that many coming-of-age novels rarely addressed the issue of sexuality from a feminine perspective. In Slate magazine in 2013, she noted that, in many classic novels, the subject of female sexuality was missing or subdued, in addition to having female characters being defined simply in opposition to dynamic male characters; when she turned to books written by men, she was turned off.

Bibliography

Books

Essays and reporting

Book reviews

References

1981 births
Living people
21st-century American non-fiction writers
21st-century American women writers
Alumni of the University of Cambridge
American investigative journalists
American relationships and sexuality writers
American women non-fiction writers
Brown University alumni
Columbia University Graduate School of Journalism alumni
Educators from New York City
American women educators
The New Yorker people
People from Minnesota
Writers from Brooklyn